The Wellington Steel Tube. Co.Ltd was a family business mainly based on the borders of West Bromwich and Tipton, Staffordshire, England and which closed in 1969. Owned by the Turner family - who also owned the Upper Arley estate in Worcestershire and created many injokes about Wellington there - it employed generations of Black Country people in hot rolled sections and tubes amongst other areas. 

The site was later sold to the British Steel Corporation, Babcock International and other concerns before in 1998 or 1999 being sold to Asda Stores, now part of the Wal-Mart chain of shops and stores. It now holds a superstore and petrol station. The site is officially called Wellington Park; and a canal bridge provided by Asda is marked as Wellington Bridge on maps.

Defunct manufacturing companies of the United Kingdom
Steel companies of the United Kingdom
Manufacturing companies disestablished in 1969